"There Are Such Things" is a popular song by Stanley Adams, Abel Baer, and George W. Meyer, published in 1942.
The first and most popular version of the song was performed by Tommy Dorsey's orchestra with vocals by Frank Sinatra and The Pied Pipers, which reached No. 1 on the US best-selling records chart in 1942. This version hit No. 2 on the Harlem Hit Parade chart. There have been many other versions recorded since.

Recorded versions
Frank Sinatra – with Tommy Dorsey & His Orchestra (1942)
Count Basie – for the album Count Basie/Sarah Vaughan (1961)
Billy Eckstine – recorded for National Records in 1948 (catalog No. 9096).
Al Hibbler – for his album Starring Al Hibbler (1956).
Ahmad Jamal – included in his album Cry Young (1967)
Etta Jones – for her album Love Shout (1962)
Al Martino – for his album This Is Al Martino  (1968).
The Modernaires – for the album We Remember Tommy Dorsey Too (1962).
Patti Page – for her album I've Heard That Song Before (1958).
The Pied Pipers – for the album A Tribute to Tommy Dorsey (1957).
Sonny Rollins – Work Time (1956)
Anne Shelton
Norman Simmons – included in the album The Art of Norman Simmons (2000).
Frank Sinatra – for the album I Remember Tommy (1961)
Jo Stafford – for her album Getting Sentimental over Tommy Dorsey (1963)
Sonny Stitt – Turn It On! (1971)
Jerry Vale – included in his album Have You Looked Into Your Heart (1965).
Sarah Vaughan – for the album Count Basie/Sarah Vaughan (1961)
Margaret Whiting – for her album Just a Dream (1960).
Sachal Vasandani – for his album We Move (2009)

Sources

1942 songs
1943 singles
Songs written by Stanley Adams (singer)
Songs written by George W. Meyer
Number-one singles in the United States
Songs written by Abel Baer